Augusta Joyce Crocheron (October 9, 1844 – March 17, 1915) was an early Latter-day Saint pioneer and writer.

Biography
Born in Boston on October 9, 1844, she was two years old when her family arrived in San Francisco on the Brooklyn. In 1867 her parents John and Caroline Joyce settled in Utah Territory, and in 1870 she became a plural wife of George W. Crocheron with whom she had three sons and two daughters.

She died at her home in Salt Lake City on March 17, 1915.

Books

Verse
Wild Flowers of Deseret (1881)

For children
The Children's Book (1890)

Biography
Representative Women of Deseret (1884)

See also
A Believing People

References

External links
 

1844 births
1915 deaths
American Latter Day Saint writers
Mormon pioneers
Poets from Utah
19th-century American writers
American women poets
Latter Day Saint poets
19th-century American women writers
Latter Day Saints from Utah
American women non-fiction writers